Dr. Werner Münch (born 25 September 1940 in Bottrop, Province of Westphalia) is a German politician (CDU). After the reunification of Germany he moved to Saxony-Anhalt where he became the first Financial Minister of this state since refounding of same after the reunification under the 1st Minister-President Gerd Gies. After Gies had to resign already in 1991 Münch was elected as 2nd Minister-President of Saxony Anhalt from 4 July 1991 to 28 November 1993, when he resigned after criticism over alleged overpayments. He was succeeded by Christoph Bergner.

On 25 February 2009 Münch quit membership of the CDU after 37 years. He motivated his step with the "loss of conservative skills" of the party under the leadership of Angela Merkel. As example he mentioned her critical words against Pope Benedict XVI.

References 

1940 births
Living people
People from Bottrop
German Roman Catholics
Members of the Landtag of Saxony-Anhalt
Christian Democratic Union of Germany politicians
People from the Province of Westphalia
Ministers-President of Saxony-Anhalt
Christian Democratic Union of Germany MEPs
MEPs for Germany 1984–1989
MEPs for Germany 1989–1994